Alexis Nicolas (born 13 February 1983) is a former professional footballer who played as a midfielder. He currently works in commercial real estate investment.

Football career
Born in Westminster, Nicolas played youth football with Aston Villa before joining Chelsea in 2001. He made his debut for Chelsea on 24 January 2004, in an FA Cup game against Scarborough; Paul Wilson of The Guardian described Nicolas' performance as "encouraging." After a loan spell with Brighton & Hove Albion, Nicolas signed for the club permanently in October 2004. After leaving Brighton, he played non-league football with St Albans City, playing for them on a week-to-week contract from September to November 2006. He joined Hadley as a player-coach in January 2012.

He was also a Cyprus under 21-international.

Finance career
After working for Franc Warwick, Nicolas set up his own firm, Springer Nicolas, in 2012.

Career statistics

References

1983 births
Living people
English footballers
Cypriot footballers
Cyprus under-21 international footballers
Aston Villa F.C. players
Chelsea F.C. players
Brighton & Hove Albion F.C. players
St Albans City F.C. players
Hadley F.C. players
Premier League players
English Football League players
Association football midfielders
English people of Greek Cypriot descent